Raúl Toro Julio (21 February 1911 – 30 October 1982) was a former Chilean international footballer who played as a forward. Several ex-footballers consider him the best player from the early history of football in Chile.

International career
Toro was a successful attacker for the Chilean senior national team with 12 goals in 13 matches including appearances at two South American Championship (Copa América), and was the top scorer of the 1937 South American Championship. At the time of his retirement as international in 1941 he was Chile's top scorer before Guillermo Subiabre (who scored 10 times by 1930).

References

External links
 Raúl Toro at MemoriaWanderers 
 Raúl Toro at PartidosdeLaRoja 

1911 births
1982 deaths
People from Copiapó
Chilean footballers
Chile international footballers
Everton de Viña del Mar footballers
Santiago Morning footballers
Santiago Wanderers footballers
Santiago National F.C. players
Chilean Primera División players
Association football forwards